The 2021–22 Austrian Cup was the 91st edition of the national cup in Austrian football. The champions of the cup earn a place in the 2022–23 Europa League play-off round.

Red Bull Salzburg were the defending champions after winning the competition in the previous season by defeating LASK in the final.
Times up to 30 October 2021 and from 27 March 2022 were CEST (UTC+2), and times from 31 October 2021 to 26 March 2022 were CET (UTC+1).

Round dates
The schedule of the competition is as follows.

First round 
Thirty-two first round matches were played between 16 July and 18 July 2021.

Second round
Sixteen second round matches were played between 21 September and 23 September 2021.

Third round
Eight third round matches were played between 26 October and 2 November 2021.

Quarter-finals
The four quarter-finals were played between 4 and 6 February 2022.

Semi-finals
The two semi-final matches were played on 2 and 16 March 2022.

Final
The final was played on 1 May 2022.

Top goalscorers

See also 
 2021–22 Austrian Football Bundesliga

References

External links
 Austrian Cup on soccerway

Austrian Cup seasons
Cup
Austrian Cup